Gerald Healy (26 March 1885 – 12 July 1946) was an Australian cricketer. He played six first-class cricket matches for Victoria between 1908 and 1915.

See also
 List of Victoria first-class cricketers

References

External links
 

1885 births
1946 deaths
Australian cricketers
Victoria cricketers
Cricketers from Melbourne